The Visa-Bikar 2001 was the forty-second season of the Icelandic national football cup.

Third round

| colspan="3" style="background:#9cc;"|June 13, 2001

|-
| colspan="3" style="background:#9cc;"|June 14, 2001

|-
| colspan="3" style="background:#9cc;"|June 15, 2001

|}

Fourth round

| colspan="3" style="background:#9cc;"|July 3, 2001

|-
| colspan="3" style="background:#9cc;"|July 4, 2001

|-
| colspan="3" style="background:#9cc;"|July 5, 2001

|}

Quarterfinals

Semifinals

Final

External links
 RSSSF Page

2001 domestic association football cups
2001 in Icelandic football
2001